Kid Safe: The Video is a 1988 direct-to-video short film. It was written and directed by horror filmmaker Stuart Gordon. It was released on a VHS that was obtained via a coupon giveaway by the sponsor of the video Triaminic. It features SCTV alumni Andrea Martin and Joe Flaherty, the latter hosting the video as Count Floyd and presenting it as an installment of Monster Horror Chiller Theater. It also features an appearance from Jason Vorhees of the Friday the 13th series.

Plot
Kathy Tudor is left home alone when her parents go out on a stormy night.  She is frightened by scary movies while channel surfing, and goes to the kitchen to make some cinnamon toast. When she puts it in the toaster she hears a noise in the other room which ends of being a tree branch scratching against the window. The smoke alarm goes off from the toast burning and she burns her fingers and gets an electric shock while attempting to remove the toast with a fork. She calls 911 and says to send help fast and then hangs up.  Later a fireman, medic and police officer show up, size up the situation and give her a lecture on safety and then leave.  Ernie tests her by knocking on the door pretending to delivering a check for the lottery, and she opens the door. They warn her never to let strangers in, then each of them give her 3 safety questions and then leave. She receives another knock on the door and a man says he has a flat tire and needs to use the phone. She says that he will go somewhere else.  The person knocking turns out to be Jason Voorhees, accompanied by a witch, werewolf, mummy and an alien.

Cast
 Andrea Martin - Kathy Tudor
 Shuko Akune - Tina the Paramedic 
 Stephen Lee - Ernie the Policeman 
 Meshach Taylor - Marty the Fireman
 Joe Flaherty - Count Floyd
 Daniel Wells - Jason
 Grenelda Thornberry - Witch
 John Vulich - Werewolf
 Keith Edmier - Mummy
 Greg Cannom - Alien

References

External links 
 

1988 direct-to-video films
Films directed by Stuart Gordon
1980s English-language films
American horror short films
1980s American films